The 1996–97 OPJHL season is the fourth season of the Ontario Provincial Junior A Hockey League (OPJHL). The twenty-two teams of the MacKenzie, MacKinnon, Phillips, and Ruddock Divisions competed in a 51-game schedule.  The top 4 teams of each division make the playoffs.

The winner of the OPJHL playoffs, the Milton Merchants, lost the 1997 Buckland Cup and Dudley Hewitt Cup to the Rayside-Balfour Sabrecats of the Northern Ontario Junior Hockey League.

Changes
Royal York Royals become the Vaughan Vipers.
Stouffville Clippers become the Stouffville Spirit.

Final standings

Note: GP = Games played; W = Wins; L = Losses; OTL = Overtime losses; SL = Shootout losses; GF = Goals for; GA = Goals against; PTS = Points; x = clinched playoff berth; y = clinched division title; z = clinched conference title

1996-97 OPJHL Playoffs

Division Semi-final
Newmarket 87's defeated Bowmanville Eagles 4-games-to-2
Kingston Voyageurs defeated Ajax Axemen 4-games-to-none
Peterborough Jr. Petes defeated Lindsay Muskies 4-games-to-2
Collingwood Blues defeated Orillia Terriers 4-games-to-2
Milton Merchants defeated Streetsville Derbys 4-games-to-none
Brampton Capitals defeated St. Michael's Buzzers 4-games-to-2
Mississauga Chargers defeated Hamilton Kiltys 4-games-to-2
Division Final
Newmarket 87's defeated Collingwood Blues 4-games-to-none
Kingston Voyageurs defeated Peterborough Jr. Petes 4-games-to-1
Milton Merchants defeated Mississauga Chargers 4-games-to-none
Bramalea Blues defeated Brampton Capitals 4-games-to-2
Semi-final
Newmarket 87's defeated Kingston Voyageurs 4-games-to-1
Milton Merchants defeated Bramalea Blues 4-games-to-3
Final
Milton Merchants defeated Newmarket 87's 4-games-to-3

OHA Buckland Cup and Dudley Hewitt Cup Championship
Best-of-7
Rayside-Balfour Sabrecats (NOJHL) defeated Milton Merchants 4-games-to-1
Milton 4 - Rayside-Balfour 0
Rayside-Balfour 4 - Milton 3 OT
Rayside-Balfour 5 - Milton 3
Rayside-Balfour 9 - Milton 2
Rayside-Balfour 4 - Milton 1

Scoring leaders
Note: GP = Games played; G = Goals; A = Assists; Pts = Points; PIM = Penalty minutes

See also
 1997 Royal Bank Cup
 Dudley Hewitt Cup
 List of OJHL seasons
 Northern Ontario Junior Hockey League
 Superior International Junior Hockey League
 Greater Ontario Junior Hockey League
 1996 in ice hockey
 1997 in ice hockey

References

External links
 Official website of the Ontario Junior Hockey League
 Official website of the Canadian Junior Hockey League

Ontario Junior Hockey League seasons
OPJHL